Jean Ledoux (25 April 1935 – 30 January 2019) was a French rower. He competed in the men's eight event at the 1960 Summer Olympics.

References

External links
 

1935 births
2019 deaths
French male rowers
Olympic rowers of France
Rowers at the 1960 Summer Olympics
Sportspeople from Val-d'Oise
World Rowing Championships medalists for France
20th-century French people